Sangrur district is in the state of Punjab in northern India. Sangrur city is the district headquarters. It is one of the five districts in Patiala Division in the Indian state of Punjab. Neighbouring districts are Malerkotla (north), Barnala (west), Patiala (east), Mansa (southwest) and Fatehabad (Haryana) and Jind (Haryana) (south). 

Sangrur consists of the cities of Dhuri, Lehragaga,  Sangrur, and Sunam. Other cities are Bhawanigarh, Dirba, Khanauri, Longowal, Cheema and Moonak. There are 7 sub-divisions, being Sangrur, Dhuri, Sunam, Lehragaga, Moonak, Bhawanigarh and Dirba. Till 2006,Barnala was also a part of Sangrur district, but now it is a separate district. In 2021, a new district Malerkotla district, consisting of Malerkotla and Ahmedgarh subdivisions and the Amargarh sub-tehsil, was formed out of Sangrur district.

Origin and history
The administrative district of Sangrur was created in 1948. Earlier the area fell in the Nabha Princely State. Settlements in Sangrur trace back to the pre-Harappan period. Recent excavations in Rohira in Sangrur have revealed a 10-metre high mound with settlements dating back to 2300 BC. Excavations from Mard Khera village have led to the discovery of pottery from the Harappan period. Remnants of pottery from the Kushan period have also been discovered.

Demographics

According to the 2011 census Sangrur district (including Malerkotla district) had a population of 1,655,169 of which male and female were 878,029 and 777,140 respectively, roughly equal to the nation of Guinea-Bissau or the US state of Idaho. This gives it a ranking of 300st in India (out of a total of 640). Its population growth rate over the decade 2001-2011 was 12.3%. Sangrur has a sex ratio of 885 females for every 1000 males, and a literacy rate of 67.99%.

After bifurcation, the district had a population of 1,225,415. Scheduled Castes made up 368,562 (30.08%) of the population.

Religion

Sikhism is followed by majority of the people in the Sangrur district. Hinduism is followed by a considerable population. Before the division of Malerkotla district, Sangrur had the largest population of Muslims in Punjab. However in the residual district Muslims are a small minority.

Language

At the time of the 2011 census, 94.93% of the population spoke Punjabi, 3.12% Hindi and 1.48% Haryanvi as their first language.

Politics

Administration
Sangrur district is further sub-divided into 7 sub-divisions/tehsils - 
Bhawanigarh, Dhuri, Dirba, Lehragaga, Moonak, Sangrur and Sunam. 

The district is part of the Sangrur Lok Sabha constituency. By-election to Sangrur Lok Sabha constituency is scheduled to be held on 23 June 2022.

Historical Places and Monuments 
 Banasar Bagh, Sangrur 
 Jind State Memorial Museum, Sangrur
 Ancestral House of Sardar Udham Singh, Sunam - The house of India's independence activist has been renovated and converted into a museum. Apart from the building itself, around 30 letters and other objects related to him are at display in the museum.
 Shahi Samadhan, Sangrur
 Clock Tower, Sangrur
 Fort Badrukhan - The fort was the residence of Maharaja Ranjit Singh's mother, Sardarni Raj Kaur.

Notable people
 

 Karamjt Anmol, actor, comedian and singer
 Aman Arora, politician
 Brish Bhan, freedom fighter, politician
 Rajinder Kaur Bhattal, Politician
 Parminder Singh Dhindsa, Politician
 Sukhdev Singh Dhindsa, Politician
 Binnu Dhillon, actor and comedian
Roshan Prince, Singer and actor
 Naresh Goyal, founder of Jet Airways
 Bhagwant Mann, actor, comedian and current chief Minister of Punjab
 Rana Ranbir, actor, comedian, and writer
 Udham Singh, Indian independence activist
 Amarjeet Sohi, Canadian politician
 Ranjit Singh Dhadrian Wale, Sikh preacher

See also
 PGIMER Satellite Centre Sangrur

References

External links

 Official website of Sangrur
 History of Sangrur

 
Districts of Punjab, India